Nikita Yurevich Mikhailis (born June 18, 1995) is a Kazakh professional ice hockey forward who is currently playing for the Barys Astana in the Kontinental Hockey League (KHL). Mikhailis began playing professionally at the age of 16 with the Nomad Astana of the Kazakhstan Hockey Championship. He played one season with Nomad, during which time he was selected 121st overall by the Barys in the 2012 KHL Junior Draft. In 2012, he began playing major junior hockey with the Barys' junior league affiliate Snezhnye Barsy of the Junior Hockey League (MHL) for three seasons. In 2014–15, he began playing for Barys and register 4 points in the regular season.

Playing career
Mikhailis developed with the Nomad Astana of the Kazakhstan Hockey Championship, joined the senior team at age of 16. After recording 25 points over 50 games in 2011–12 with Nomad, Barys decided to receive rights to him selecting 121st overall in the fourth round of the 2012 KHL Junior Draft. In 2012, he joined its affiliate Snezhnye Barsy in the Junior Hockey League (MHL). In his inaugural season in MHL, he recorded 37 points in 60 games, the second highest record in the team. Mikhailis stayed with Snezhnye Barsy another season and recorded a junior career-high 45 points in 56 games. During 2014 pre-season, Mikhailis named the first candidate to be a limit player in coming season at Barys. On September 6, 2014, he made his KHL debut in the match against the Amur Khabarovsk. On September 8, 2014, Mikhailis suffered a broken collarbone in a game against the Admiral Vladivostok. He recorded his first point, an assist, on December 30 against the Traktor Chelyabinsk. Later, he scored his first KHL goal, a game winner against Jakub Kovar in a 4–1 win against the Avtomobilist Yekaterinburg on January 10. He completed the season with 2 goals and 2 points over 23 games. He also played 4 games for Snezhnye Barsy in MHL.

International play
Mikhailis made his international debut with Kazakhstan in Division IB of the 2012 IIHF World U18 Championships, held in Hungary. With 9 points, he was the second top scorer in the tournament, helping Kazakhstan to second place in their pool. At the 2013 IIHF World U18 Championships, Kazakhstan finished first in their Division IB, earning a promotion to the Division IA for the following year. Recording six goals and twelve points over five games, he became tournament's second top scorer.

Mikhailis advanced to the under-20 level, playing in Division IB  of the 2013 World Junior Championships, held in Ukraine. He scored 1 goal and 3 assist in 5 matches as Kazakhstan finished second in their group to Poland, missing out on a promotion to the main tournament for the following year.
In December 2013, Mikhailis made his second appearance at the under-20 level in the 2014 IIHF World Junior Championships' Division I tournament, held in Great Britain. Finishing with 11 points over 5 games, he became tournament's top scorer. At his third appearance for the under-20 team at the 2015 IIHF World Junior Championships, held in Hungary, Mikhailis helped Kazakhstan to promote to Division IA and became tournament's top scorer with 11 points.

In January 2023, he became the author of the most beautiful puck in a week according to the Kontinental Hockey League. He scored the decisive goal in overtime, which brought victory to Barys – 3:2.

Personal life
Mikhailis was born in Karagandy, Kazakhstan. His father, Yuri Mikhailis, is a former ice hockey player and currently the head coach of the Nomad Astana of the Kazakhstan Hockey Championship. Mikhailis began to play hockey in Orsk, while his father played there for Yuzhny Ural.

Career statistics

Regular season and playoffs

International

Awards

References

External links 

1995 births
Living people
Barys Astana draft picks
Barys Nur-Sultan players
Kazakhstani ice hockey forwards
Nomad Astana players
Sportspeople from Karaganda
Snezhnye Barsy players
Ice hockey players at the 2017 Asian Winter Games
Asian Games gold medalists for Kazakhstan
Medalists at the 2017 Asian Winter Games
Asian Games medalists in ice hockey
Universiade silver medalists for Kazakhstan
Universiade medalists in ice hockey
Competitors at the 2017 Winter Universiade